Conrad IV of Germany (1228–1254) was King of Germany (King of the Romans) from 1237 to 1254.

Conrad IV or Konrad IV may also refer to:

Conrad IV of Tann (died 1236), German Roman Catholic bishop
Conrad IV of Swabia or Conradin (1252–1268)
Conrad IV, Count of Rietberg (c. 1371–1428)
Konrad IV the Older (c. 1384–1447), Duke of Silesia
Conrad IV (1408–1419), Count of Fürstenberg-Wolfach
Conrad IV of Bussnang (died 1471), French Roman Catholic bishop